Charlwood is a village and civil parish in the Mole Valley district of Surrey, England. It is immediately northwest of London Gatwick Airport in West Sussex, close west of Horley and north of Crawley. The historic county boundary between Surrey and Sussex ran to the south of Gatwick Airport. Boundaries were reformed in 1974 so that the county boundary between Surrey and West Sussex, delineated by the Sussex Border Path, now runs along the northern perimeter of the airport, and the southern extent of Charlwood.

Geography
A narrow ridge of Sussex Marble runs through the west of the parish, where it is followed for a distance by the Sussex Border Path.  Elevations range from 60 to 140m above sea level.  No dual carriageways bisect the area and London Gatwick Airport has its perimeter immediately to the south-west.

History

Before 1800

The village anciently lay within the Reigate Hundred.   Its variant spellings from such medieval records as the Feet of fines include: Cherlewude (13th century); Cherlwude (that century and the next, when Chorlwode also appeared).  After this Charlewood appears commonly in 18th-century records.

The place is not mentioned in the Domesday Book of 1086, and was probably a forest district of the manor of Merstham, Surrey which until shortly after 1911 reached into the parish.  In the medieval period this was held by Christchurch Priory. About 1890 a vessel of Paludina Limestone (Sussex 'marble') was found on the estate of Mr. Young, Stan Hill/Stanhill, which the finders regarded as an ancient font, but which was perhaps a stone mortar.  Charlwood Place is a 16th-century listed moated house situated on the northwestern perimeter of the village.  The mother of John Pitseus, a recusant Bishop in France, lived there.

Sir Richard Lechford, following a Lechford owner of 1567, conveyed the manor in 1625 to Edmund Jordan whose family held it until 1759.  A descendant, John Sharp, succeeded and held the property intact until 1806, when he sold the manors of Charlwood, Hook, in the parish and Shiremark in Capel to Thomas Kerr.

A historic cricket match was held in Charlwood in June 1741. This was Surrey v London and won by the county team. The match is the only time that Charlwood features in surviving cricket records.

After 1800
Total enclosure (of the common land) took place in phases: in 1843, 1844 and 1854, including of Johnson's Common and White's Common, once considered infertile land. Lowfield Heath was in the parish and was enclosed in 1846. Charlwood's cottage hospital opened in 1873 but was closed in 1911. Charlwood Boys' School was built in 1840. Charlwood Girls' and Infants' School was built in 1852 and enlarged in 1893.

Lowfield Heath School was built in 1868. Gatwick Racecourse, opened in 1891, after the closing of the Croydon Racecourse at Woodside, Croydon.

Pursuant to the intentions of the Ministry for Local Government, a move of Charlwood under the Local Government Act 1974 from Surrey to West Sussex was underway that year, which was prevented from completing by a further act of parliament in the same year – the Charlwood and Horley Act 1974 – to ensure it stayed in Surrey.

The village has more crown post timber-framed houses than any other village in Britain.

Governance
Charlwood is in the Mole Valley District which co-administers local services with Surrey County Council.  Additional local amenities are provided, with Hookwood, by its (civil) parish council.

Landmarks

Lowfield Heath Windmill

Charlwood's western limestone escarpment is the home of this windmill, which was moved from the village of Lowfield Heath when it was threatened with demolition in the 1970s, part of which took place to that village to accommodate Gatwick Airport's growth.

Church

St Nicholas's is a Grade I listed building with intact Norman era stones.  It has a particularly historically significant series of murals on the south wall of the chancel, contemporary with the south aisle which has been dated as c. 1300. These include scenes from the story of St Margaret and St Nicholas, amongst others.

Providence Chapel

Providence Chapel, a Grade II* listed building, stands on a lane to the north of the village.  The weatherboarded single-storey building was re-erected there in 1816 after being moved from Horsham, where it served as an officers' mess during the Napoleonic Wars.  It was used as a Nonconformist chapel for almost 200 years, but was put up for sale in 2012.

It was bought by the Providence Chapel Charlwood Trust and restored with the aid of a grant from the Heritage Lottery Fund.

Amenities

Park
The village is centred on the "rec", which comprises: a redeveloped children's playground, and the sports pitches of Charlwood F.C. who currently play Intermediate football in the Mid Sussex Championship, Sunday side Charlwood Village F.C. and of Ifield Cricket Club.

The village used to have its 'own' cricket club (Charlwood C.C.) which for many years was seen playing on both Saturdays and Sundays on the green. In latter years the club only put out one side, on a Sunday, but managed to achieve the distinction of not losing a single game for more than three seasons (between 1989 and 1991), a record that still stands. The club closed in 2002 but its grounds are used in Summer by the replacement club described.

Schools
The village has its own primary school, expanded from an infant school in 2016.

Charlwood is also home to the John Bristow and Thomas Mason Trust, which has its earliest origins in Charlwood's first school established in the early 17th-century, This building is still intact and owned by the Trust.

Shopping and social
Charlwood has a small number of shops and two pubs; The Greyhound''' and The Half Moon''.

Hotels
Charlwood has two hotels in imposing buildings and numerous Bed and Breakfasts on its outskirts.

Stanhill Court was built in 1881 as the home of William Young, one of the six signatories to the formation of Lloyd's of London by virtue of The  Lloyds Act 1871. The exterior is classic Sussex brick and hanging tile, while the interior is in Scots' Baronial style using pitch pine. The fireplace surrounds are of polished Charlwood stone ( Paludina Limestone / Sussex Marble) quarried on the grounds.

In 1986 the great-granddaughter of William Young converted the building into an 11 bedroom hotel. In 1992 Stanhill Court Hotel was leased to Antonio and Kathryn Colas who purchased it in 1994. In 1995 the owners were in dispute with the Parish Council over their proposals to build a two-storey extension to the hotel. The newspaper article reporting this includes a photograph of the owners standing on the staircase with an imposing stained glass window behind them. This window features the arms of the original owners. The hotel was subsequently increased in bedroom and function room capacity with the additional wing, and has been awarded an AA Most Romantic Hotel award. In 1998 the owners won a contract to host British Airways conferences. The Court was used in an episode of the television drama, The Bill.

The first owners of Stanhill Court were William Wallace Young (1826-1896) and his wife Frances Wallace Galbraith (1837-1919).The earliest newspaper reference to the Court is in 1884. This was a report on the flower and vegetable exhibition of the Charlwood Cottage Garden Society on 27 August. Mr W Young of Stan Hill Court lent plants and flowers for decorative purposes. In 1886 William Young wrote to the editor of the Surrey Mirror objecting to a requirement that the residents of Charlwood poll at Newdigate rather than at Horley as this would entail a seven-mile walk along muddy lanes.

William Young died in 1896, aged 70. His obituary read: “Died in New York on May 10. For forty years he had been well-known in the City where he had long held a prominent position at Lloyd’s, of which institution he was one of the senior members at the time of his death. He had sat on the committee for many years, had been a chairman of the committee of Lloyd’s Register, as well as being a director and chairman of the Bank of Africa. He had made his home at Stanhill where he devoted much time and money to the support of village schools, cottage hospitals, working men’s houses, as well as to the work of church restoration. He was also a strenuous worker in the field of education. He had been a governor of Dulwich College since 1872, and a governor of Cowper Street School. He was the author of a two-volume history of Dulwich College, issued in 1889.”.

In his Will, William Young bequeathed for life the use of Stanhill Court and the income of the residuary estate to his wife. On her death Stanhill Court and other premises in Charlwood and Newdigate were to be sold and the proceeds divided between his three sons.

For at least the first twenty years of the 20th century the Court, while remaining in the possession of the Youngs, does not seem to have been occupied by them. In 1901 Frances Young and her daughter Violet were living at Molyneux Park Mansions private hotel, Tunbridge Wells, with one servant, a sick nurse. In 1911 Frances was living at The Elms, Tittle Row, Maidenhead with servants. In 1901 Stanhill Court was occupied by Herbert J Robinson, Colonel commanding 6th Lancashire Artillery, his son and servants. There is a separate entry in the census for the lodge at Stanhill Court at this time. In 1911 Dania Hepburn, son of Andrew Hepburn, was living at the Court with his two sisters and servants. In 1919 Andrew Hepburn, a Scotsman who was a timber merchant trading with Natal, South Africa, as president of the Lowfield Heath, Charlwood and District Horticultural Society, provided a lunch at the Charlwood Show, though he was at the time absent on business in South Africa. At his death in 1933 Andrew Hepburn was resident at Lackford Manor, Bury St Edmunds, Suffolk but was described as a former resident of Stanhill Court.

On the death of Frances Young, Stanhill Court was offered for sale in 1920. The notice of sale read: “Sale of Stanhill Court. A residential and sporting estate extending to 564 acres and including the modern mansion of Stanhill Court, comprising 5 reception rooms, 17 bedrooms and two bathrooms. To be sold with vacant possession.”  The Court was offered for sale again in 1924, but only 30 acres of farmland known as "Barebones" was sold. In 1939 Francis Gordon Young (1871-1959), son of William Young, and his wife Elsie Evelyn Reynolds (1868-1957) lived at Stanhill Court with their servants. The earliest newspaper reference to Gordon Young and his wife living at the Court is in 1924. Gymkhanas were held in the grounds in the late 1940s.

SSSI

Glover's Wood, a Site of Special Scientific Interest is wholly within the west of Charlwood, and is noted for its bluebell displays in springtime.

Gatwick Aviation Museum
Gatwick Aviation Museum is on the north western perimeter of Gatwick Airport to the south east of the village.

Localities

Hookwood
Hookwood  is a clustered semi-agricultural 'village' in many contemporary definitions which is to the east starting at the southern tip of the A217, between Charlwood's centre and Horley.  Hookwood Common was mentioned as 'still open ground' by the county topographer H. E. Malden in 1911, in the relevant Victoria County History.  He also records that the misses Sanders who co-owned Hookwood House belonged to the old Sanders family of Charlwood.  It is the most projecting settled part of the parish and its nearest amenities are equidistant, either those of  economically important Horley or the smaller, more traditional amenities of Charlwood.

Russ Hill
Russ Hill  is the area to the south west, a semi-agricultural and semi-wooded upland area which has the largest hotel in the civil parish of Charlwood.  Reflecting its woodland, the statistical area extended to Norwood Hill (see below).  Together these outlying parts had a population of 416 across  as at the 2011 UK Census. The bending Charlwood to Rusper makes up the access to almost all properties making the neighbourhood a traditional linear settlement.

Norwood Hill
Norwood Hill  is spread around a crossroads, closest to which is a pub.  It is to the north and shares its single statistical output area with Russ Hill above. It has nearest access to the basic amenities of Charlwood in the same way, as well as the much larger amenities of Horley to the east of the parish in social and leisure and employment of Horley and the Borough of Crawley in terms of its economy other than farming and retirement properties which together accounted for a minority of the population as at the 2011 Census.

Demography and housing

The average level of accommodation in the region composed of detached houses was 28%, the average that was apartments was 22.6%.

The proportion of households in the civil parish which owned their home outright compares to the regional average of 35.1%.  The proportion which owned their home with a loan compares to the regional average of 32.5%.  The remaining % is made up of rented dwellings (plus a negligible % of households living rent-free).

Notable people

 Donald Campbell CBE (1921–1967), previous Land speed record and Water speed record holder, may have been born at, and certainly lived at, Povey Cross in Hookwood at the eastern end of Charlwood parish.
 Sir Malcolm Campbell MBE (1885–1948), racing driver and record holder, father of Donald, lived at Povey Cross House, in Hookwood
 Charles Cardell (1895–1977), a pagan priest, lived at Dumbledene estate in Charlwood.
 Don Charlwood (1915–2012), Australian-born author and aviator, visited the village during the war and discovered that his ancestors were buried in the cemetery there.
 Phil Creswick (born 1965) member of the boyband Big Fun
 Trevor Grant (1926–1957) an English first-class cricketer. 
 Billy Monger (born 1999), British Formula 3 racing driver and TV presenter, survived a huge accident at Donnington Park in 2017, lost both of his lower legs.
 Nicholas Sanders (ca.1530 – 1581) an English Catholic priest and polemicist.
 Barry Sheene  MBE (1950–2003), former British World Champion of Grand Prix motorcycle racing lived in Charlwood before his move to Australia in the late 1980s.
 E H Shepard OBE MC (1879–1976), illustrator of Winnie the Pooh, lived for a time with his sister in Charlwood.
 David Sheppard, Baron Sheppard of Liverpool (1929–2005), Bishop of Liverpool, England cricket captain was brought up in Charlwood.
 George Street (1889–1924) an English first-class cricketer
 Martyn Wyndham-Read (born 1942), folk singer, collector and singer of Australian folk music.

See also
 Gatwick Aviation Museum
 List of places of worship in Mole Valley

Notes

References

External links

Charlwood Parish Council
Charlwood FC

Civil parishes in Surrey
Cricket in Surrey
English cricket venues in the 18th century
Mole Valley
Villages in Surrey